Zabrđe is a populated place in the Kotor Varoš municipality of central Republika Srpska, Bosnia and Herzegovina. It has been one of six municipalities in Kotor Varoš former County also.

Population

Municipality populations of  Kotor Varoš County,  1953

See also
Kotor Varoš
Vrbanja

References 

Villages in Bosnia and Herzegovina
Populated places in Kotor Varoš